Black and Blues is an album by American guitarist James Blood Ulmer recorded in 1990 and released on the Japanese DIW label.

Reception
The Allmusic review awarded the album 3 stars.

Track listing
All compositions by James Blood Ulmer
 "Burning Like Love" - 5:54  
 "Crying" - 6:12  
 "Lady of Colours" - 5:38  
 "Tower of Power" - 3:54  
 "New York Day" - 6:32  
 "Make It Right" - 5:39  
 "Sign Language" - 6:30  
 "No Other Lover" - 4:40  
 "Uptown" - 6:02  
Recorded at the Power Station, New York on October 24, 25, November 6 and 7, 1990

Personnel
James Blood Ulmer - electric guitar, vocals
 Amin Ali - bass guitar
 Ronnie Drayton - guitar (1, 2, 4 & 6)
 G. Calvin Weston - drums

References

DIW Records albums
James Blood Ulmer albums
1991 albums